José María Gómez de Cervantes y Altamirano de Velasco Padilla y Ovando (14 May 1786 – 3 December 1856), Count of Santiago de Calimaya and Marquess of Salinas, was a Mexican army officer who signed the Act of Independence of the Mexican Empire along Agustín de Iturbide and his uncle, Juan María Cervantes y Padilla.

He was the son of Ignacio Gómez de Cervantes and doña Marina Altamirano de Velasco, countess of Santiago de Calimaya and Marquise of Salinas. He entered the Spanish royal army in 1810 as captain in the Distinguished Patriots of Ferdinand VII battalions created by Viceroy Francisco Javier Venegas, rose to colonel in 1813 and joined the Mexican independence movement in 1815.

He married twice in his life; first to doña María Michaus y Oroquieta and the later to doña Ana María Ozta y Cotera, Marquise of Rivascacho, with whom he had a son: don José María Cervantes Ozta, who inherited his title and, after marrying doña Magdalena Ayestarán, fathered don Ignacio Cervantes Ayestarán, the last count of Santiago de Calimaya before Mexico's independence, who married Carmen Cauz and had not descendants; and Guadalupe Cervantes Ayestarán who married Don Francisco Cauz and whose descendants would have inherited the titles.

Portrait by Ignacio Ayala

His portrait is part of the Museum Collection Fund and the Dick S. Ramsay Fund of the Brooklyn Museum, but it is not on view.

According to Amerlinck, his stiff posture and tube-like rendering of his arms indicate an early search for abstraction pursued by some local artists of the period.

References

People of the Mexican War of Independence
1786 births
1856 deaths